Darren Russell Carrington (born October 10, 1966) is a former safety who played 8 seasons in the National Football League for five different teams. He played college football at Northern Arizona University, where he averaged over 27 yards per kickoff return, with a career best of 99 yards.  As a senior in 1988, he had 39 tackles, 2 interceptions and 2 forced fumbles, which was enough to get him selected in the 5th round of the 1989 NFL draft.

Carrington started in Super Bowl XXIX for the San Diego Chargers and was the Denver Broncos kick returner in Super Bowl XXIV, which he finished with a franchise-record 6 kickoff returns (now shared with Glyn Milburn and Reuben Droughns) for 146 yards, including a 39-yard return that set up the Broncos only touchdown of the game.  His best season was in 1993, when he intercepted 7 passes and returned them for 104 yards.  He was selected by the Jacksonville Jaguars in the 1995 NFL Expansion Draft.

In his eight NFL seasons, Carrington intercepted 22 passes and returned them for 377 yards and a touchdown.  He also returned 6 kickoffs for 176 yards. 's NFL off-season, he held the Broncos franchise record for most kick returns in a playoff game (6 in Super Bowl XXIV; with Glyn Milburn and Reuben Droughns), and average yards per return in a single post-season (24.63 in 1989).

Darren Carrington is a 1984 graduate of James Monroe High School.  He has a son, also named Darren, who played wide receiver for the Oregon Ducks until he was dismissed following a DUI arrest. He played his senior year for the Utah Utes.

Carrington lives in San Diego with his wife and three children. He works as the marriage and parenting pastor for the Rock Church.

His daughter Daria is the head coach of the West Coast Breeze of The Basketball League.

His daughter DiJonai Carrington plays for the Connecticut Sun of the WNBA after previously playing for the Baylor Bears and Stanford Cardinal women's basketball teams.

References

1966 births
Living people
American football safeties
Denver Broncos players
Detroit Lions players
San Diego Chargers players
Jacksonville Jaguars players
Oakland Raiders players
Northern Arizona Lumberjacks football players
James Monroe High School (New York City) alumni